Stephanie Vogt was the defending champion, but lost to top seed Kaia Kanepi in the second round.

Top seed Kanepi went on to win the title, defeating Teliana Pereira in the final, 6–2, 6–4.

Seeds

Main draw

Finals

Top half

Bottom half

References 
 Main draw

Open Gdf Suez De Biarritz - Singles